Sholom Katz (born 1919, died February 20, 1982) was a Jewish cantor and rabbi.

Early life 
Sholom was born in Oradea, Romania in 1919. By age 13 he was a recognized cantor.  At age 18 he was ordained a rabbi and was cantor for a synagogue in Chișinău, a Jewish center in Romania. During World War II Sholom was deported to a Nazi internment camp in Bralow, Ukraine. According to Katz, he sang the jewish prayer for the dead and the officer in charge was so moved by his voice that he spared him and allowed him to escape to freedom.

Career 
In 1946 Sholom was invited to Switzerland to sing at the World Zionist Congress. He sang the "Keil Molei Rachamim”while Chaim Weizmann gave a eulogy for Jews who had died during the Second World War. His singing of "Keil Molei Rachamim” was later awarded by Paris Match as their annual "Prix du Disque".

Sholom immigrated to America in 1947, where he became a cantor at Beth Sholom Congregation in Washington, D.C. He remained a cantor there until the year 1957. He made more than 160 recordings of his own music. Sholom sang for the closing scene of The Garden of the Finzi-Continis and also sang for the film, The Eichmann Story.

Personal life and death 
Sholom was married to Sabrina Katz. They had two children, Benjamin Katz, and a daughter, Judith Katz. Katz died at Walter Reed Army Medical Center in Bethesda, Maryland, after a heart attack. He was 67 years old.

References 

American people of Romanian-Jewish descent
American rabbis
Hazzans
People from Oradea
Rabbis from Chișinău
20th-century Romanian rabbis
Romanian emigrants to the United States